Leucoptera obelacma is a moth in the family Lyonetiidae. It is known from South Africa.

References

Endemic moths of South Africa
Leucoptera (moth)
Moths of Africa
Moths described in 1918